The Stand: Captain Trips is a five-issue comic book miniseries, the first of six The Stand series by Marvel Comics, adapting Stephen King's 1978 novel of the same name. It was overseen by King, written by Roberto Aguirre-Sacasa, illustrated by Mike Perkins, and colored by Laura Martin. "Captain Trips" refers to both the title of the first third of The Stand and of a slang term used within the novel for a viral biological weapon that obliterates a significant portion of the world's human population.

A promotional sketchbook for the series was released in July 2007.

Issues 

A collected edition of the mini-series was released on March 11, 2009.  It included all five issues of the series, as well as the previously released Sketchbook, a comprehensive cover gallery, and additional pages on the development of the series (e.g., character sketches, script pages, sketch pages).

Promotion

Artist Mike Perkins appeared at a midnight signing at Midtown Comics in Times Square, Manhattan to promote the book. Perkins appeared with Peter David, the co-writer of Marvel's Dark Tower comics, who was present to promote the publication of The Dark Tower: Treachery.

References

External links
 UGO Debuts First Readable 6 Pages of Comic, UGO,   September 8, 2008
 Marvel Chats About King's The Stand, IGN,   June 1, 2008
 WW Philly: Marvel Adapts Stephen King's "The Stand", Comic Book Resources, June 1, 2008 
 Mike Perkins interview at Marvel.com
 WizardWorld Chicago: Mike Perkins Takes "The Stand", Comic Book Resources, June 27, 2008
 Stephen King's The Stand: Captain Trips Release Log, stephenking.com, September 10, 2008

2008 comics debuts
Captain Trips